The 1922 Lafayette football team was an American football team that represented Lafayette College in the 1922 college football season. The team compiled a 7–2 and outscored opponents by a total of 206 to 40. Jock Sutherland was head coach, and the team's captain was Frank Schwab.

Schedule

References

Lafayette
Lafayette Leopards football seasons
Lafayette football